Koroumba is a village in north-western Ivory Coast. It is in the sub-prefecture of N'Goloblasso, Madinani Department, Kabadougou Region, Denguélé District.

Koroumba was a commune until March 2012, when it became one of 1126 communes nationwide that were abolished.

Notes

Former communes of Ivory Coast
Populated places in Denguélé District
Populated places in Kabadougou